The 2019 FIVB Women's Club World Championship was the 13th edition of the tournament. For the second straight time it was held in Shaoxing, China from 3 to 8 December. Eight teams competed in the tournament, including four wild cards.

Qualification

Pools composition

Squads

Venue

Pool standing procedure
 Number of matches won
 Match points
 Sets ratio
 Points ratio
 If the tie continues as per the point ratio between two teams, the priority will be given to the team which won the last match between them. When the tie in points ratio is between three or more teams, a new classification of these teams in the terms of points 1, 2 and 3 will be made taking into consideration only the matches in which they were opposed to each other.

Match won 3–0 or 3–1: 3 match points for the winner, 0 match points for the loser
Match won 3–2: 2 match points for the winner, 1 match point for the loser

Preliminary round
All times are China Standard Time (UTC+08:00).

Pool A

|}

|}

Pool B

|}

|}

Classification round
All times are China Standard Time (UTC+08:00).

Classification 5th–8th

|}

7th place match

|}

5th place match

|}

Final round
All times are China Standard Time (UTC+08:00).

Semifinals

|}

3rd place match

|}

Final

|}

Final standing

Awards

Most Valuable Player
 Paola Egonu (Imoco Volley Conegliano)
Best Opposite
 Isabelle Haak (VakıfBank İstanbul)
Best Outside Spikers
 Kim Yeon-koung (Eczacıbaşı VitrA İstanbul)
 Kimberly Hill (Imoco Volley Conegliano)

Best Middle Blockers
 Zehra Güneş (VakıfBank İstanbul)
 Robin de Kruijf (Imoco Volley Conegliano)
Best Setter
 Joanna Wołosz (Imoco Volley Conegliano)
Best Libero
 Simge Şebnem Aköz (Eczacıbaşı VitrA İstanbul)

See also
 2019 FIVB Volleyball Men's Club World Championship

References

External links
Official website

FIVB Volleyball Women's Club World Championship
FIVB Women's Club World Championship
International volleyball competitions hosted by China
FIVB
Sport in Zhejiang
FIVB